Valdejalón  is a comarca in Aragon, Spain. It is located in Zaragoza Province, in the transitional area between the Iberian System and the Ebro Valley.

The capital of Valdejalón is La Almunia de Doña Godina, located at the western end of Sierra de Algairén. This comarca is one of the main sites of the Mudéjar Architecture of Aragon.

Municipalities
Almonacid de la Sierra 
La Almunia de Doña Godina 
Alpartir 
Bardallur 
Calatorao 
Chodes 
Épila 
Lucena de Jalón 
Lumpiaque 
Morata de Jalón 
La Muela 
Plasencia de Jalón 
Ricla 
Rueda de Jalón 
Salillas de Jalón 
Santa Cruz de Grío  
Urrea de Jalón

See also
Comarcas of Aragon

References

Comarca de Valdejalón

Comarcas of Aragon
Geography of the Province of Zaragoza